Roger Nilson (born 5 March 1949) is a Swedish sailor and physician. He has competed in the Volvo Ocean Race seven times: he sailed with Alaska Eagle in 1981–82, Drum in 1985–86, The Card in 1989–90, Intrum Justitia in 1993–94, Swedish Match in 1997–98, Amer Sports One in 2001–02, Telefónica Black in 2008–09.

References

External links
 

Swedish male sailors (sport)
Volvo Ocean Race sailors
Volvo Ocean 60 class sailors
1949 births
Living people